Tabernaemontana cordata is a species of plant in the family Apocynaceae. It is endemic to the Island of Mindanao in the southern Philippines.  It is listed as vulnerable.

References

Flora of the Philippines
cordata
Vulnerable plants
Plants described in 1912
Taxonomy articles created by Polbot
Taxa named by Elmer Drew Merrill